Duwibong is a mountain in the counties of Jeongseon and Yeongwol, Gangwon-do in South Korea.

See also
List of mountains in Korea

Notes

References

Mountains of South Korea
Mountains of Gangwon Province, South Korea
One-thousanders of South Korea
zh:斗围峰